The 32nd Seoul Music Awards is a award ceremony held on January 19, 2023. It was organized by Sports Seoul and broadcast through KBS Joy and U+Idol Live. The ceremony was hosted by Choi Min-ho, Mijoo, and Kim Il-joong.

Criteria
All songs and albums that are eligible to be nominated must be released from January to December 2022.

Winners and nominees
Winners and nominees are listed in alphabetical order. Winners will be listed first and emphasized in bold.

The list of nominees were announced on December 6, 2022, through the official website. Voting opened on Seoul Music Awards mobile application on December 6, 2022, and closed on January 15, 2023.

Main awards

Genre-based awards

Other awards

Multiple awards
The following artist(s) received three or more awards:

Presenters
The list of presenters was announced on January 9, 2023.

Performers

Broadcast

References

External links
  

2023 in South Korean music
2023 music awards